WCLE-FM (104.1 FM, "Mix 104.1") is a radio station broadcasting an adult contemporary music format. Licensed to Calhoun, Tennessee, the station is currently owned by Hartline, LLC and features programming from Fox News Radio, Vol Network, Titans Radio Network, and Motor Racing Network.

Although the station is licensed to Calhoun, the transmitter is located on Candies Creek Ridge in the northern part of neighboring Bradley County, and the studios are located in Cleveland. Its sister station is WCLE-AM, with which it shares a studio.

WCLE-FM was originally established in 1961, signing on on August 1 of that year. The original station was the predecessor to modern WUSY. At first, the station was powered at 5,100 watts and only served the Cleveland area. WCLE-FM was also a daytimer and simulcast the AM's programming by day and continued broadcasting at night. The station switched to WUSY in 1981. WCLE-FM returned in September 1993, and describes itself as playing a mix of music from the 1970s, 1980s, and 1990s to the present.

References

External links

CLE-FM
Mainstream adult contemporary radio stations in the United States
McMinn County, Tennessee
Mass media in Bradley County, Tennessee